Clifton Beach may refer to:
 Clifton Beach, Queensland, Australia
 Clifton Beach, Tasmania, Australia
 Clifton Beach, Karachi, Pakistan
 Clifton B. Beach (1845-1902), U.S. Representative from Ohio
 Clifton, Cape Town, South Africa.